Hyatt Regency Hong Kong may refer to:
Hyatt Regency Hong Kong, Tsim Sha Tsui, located in Kowloon, Hong Kong
Hyatt Regency Hong Kong, Sha Tin, located in New Territories, Hong Kong
Hyatt Regency Hong Kong, formerly located at 63 Nathan Road
See also
Grand Hyatt Hong Kong